is a Japanese volcanic peak in the area south-east of Mount Fuji. Its summit, 1,504 meters high, is located in the Susono City, Shizuoka. It is the highest peak of the Mount Ashitaka lava dome.

History
 Mount Echizen-dake erupted in the mid-Pleistocene epoch, about 100,000 years ago.  It is an extinct volcano.
 Echizen-dake was depicted on the 50-yen banknote of the 1938 issue.

Gallery

See also
List of volcanoes in Japan
List of mountains in Japan

References

The page incorporated material from Japanese Wikipedia page 越前岳, accessed 23 April 2019

External links

Mountains of Shizuoka Prefecture